The South Akcakoca Sub-Basin (SASB) is a gas field in the Turkish part of the Black Sea.

References

Natural gas
Black Sea